The Vyazma constituency (No.168) was a Russian legislative constituency in Smolensk Oblast from 1993 to 2007. The constituency was based in rural central and eastern Smolensk Oblast. In 2016 former territory of Vyazma constituency was split between Smolensk constituency (northern part) and Roslavl constituency (southern part).

Members elected

Election results

1993

|-
! colspan=2 style="background-color:#E9E9E9;text-align:left;vertical-align:top;" |Candidate
! style="background-color:#E9E9E9;text-align:left;vertical-align:top;" |Party
! style="background-color:#E9E9E9;text-align:right;" |Votes
! style="background-color:#E9E9E9;text-align:right;" |%
|-
|style="background-color:"|
|align=left|Vyacheslav Balalayev
|align=left|Agrarian Party
|
|38.19%
|-
|style="background-color:#EA3C38"|
|align=left|Sergey Semkin
|align=left|Civic Union
| -
|12.70%
|-
| colspan="5" style="background-color:#E9E9E9;"|
|- style="font-weight:bold"
| colspan="3" style="text-align:left;" | Total
| 
| 100%
|-
| colspan="5" style="background-color:#E9E9E9;"|
|- style="font-weight:bold"
| colspan="4" |Source:
|
|}

1995

|-
! colspan=2 style="background-color:#E9E9E9;text-align:left;vertical-align:top;" |Candidate
! style="background-color:#E9E9E9;text-align:left;vertical-align:top;" |Party
! style="background-color:#E9E9E9;text-align:right;" |Votes
! style="background-color:#E9E9E9;text-align:right;" |%
|-
|style="background-color:"|
|align=left|Dmitry Abramenkov
|align=left|Communist Party
|
|26.04%
|-
|style="background-color:"|
|align=left|Aleksandr Kozyrev
|align=left|Liberal Democratic Party
|
|16.75%
|-
|style="background-color:"|
|align=left|Vyacheslav Balalayev (incumbent)
|align=left|Agrarian Party
|
|15.46%
|-
|style="background-color:#3A46CE"|
|align=left|Vladimir Novikov
|align=left|Democratic Choice of Russia – United Democrats
|
|5.48%
|-
|style="background-color:"|
|align=left|Sergey Stepanov
|align=left|Union of Communists
|
|3.94%
|-
|style="background-color:"|
|align=left|Inna Demidova
|align=left|Independent
|
|3.66%
|-
|style="background-color:#2C299A"|
|align=left|Anatoly Sokol
|align=left|Congress of Russian Communities
|
|3.33%
|-
|style="background-color:#F9DA00"|
|align=left|Valery Latyshev
|align=left|National Republican Party
|
|3.29%
|-
|style="background-color:#DA2021"|
|align=left|Aleksandr Grinkevich
|align=left|Ivan Rybkin Bloc
|
|2.77%
|-
|style="background-color:"|
|align=left|Natalya Argonova
|align=left|Forward, Russia!
|
|2.65%
|-
|style="background-color:"|
|align=left|Andrey Serdyukov
|align=left|Independent
|
|2.04%
|-
|style="background-color:"|
|align=left|Aleksandr Zhidkov
|align=left|Independent
|
|1.72%
|-
|style="background-color:#FF8201"|
|align=left|Ivan Popkov
|align=left|Christian-Democratic Union - Christians of Russia
|
|1.54%
|-
|style="background-color:"|
|align=left|Vladimir Koloskov
|align=left|Independent
|
|0.99%
|-
|style="background-color:#000000"|
|colspan=2 |against all
|
|8.62%
|-
| colspan="5" style="background-color:#E9E9E9;"|
|- style="font-weight:bold"
| colspan="3" style="text-align:left;" | Total
| 
| 100%
|-
| colspan="5" style="background-color:#E9E9E9;"|
|- style="font-weight:bold"
| colspan="4" |Source:
|
|}

1999

|-
! colspan=2 style="background-color:#E9E9E9;text-align:left;vertical-align:top;" |Candidate
! style="background-color:#E9E9E9;text-align:left;vertical-align:top;" |Party
! style="background-color:#E9E9E9;text-align:right;" |Votes
! style="background-color:#E9E9E9;text-align:right;" |%
|-
|style="background-color:"|
|align=left|Dmitry Abramenkov (incumbent)
|align=left|Communist Party
|
|24.11%
|-
|style="background-color:"|
|align=left|Viktor Derenkovsky
|align=left|Independent
|
|21.50%
|-
|style="background-color:"|
|align=left|Vladimir Kishenin
|align=left|Independent
|
|12.45%
|-
|style="background-color:"|
|align=left|Leonid Kravchenko
|align=left|Independent
|
|7.65%
|-
|style="background:#1042A5"| 
|align=left|Mikhail Khvostantsev
|align=left|Union of Right Forces
|
|6.39%
|-
|style="background-color:"|
|align=left|Nikolay Pavlov
|align=left|Russian All-People's Union
|
|6.24%
|-
|style="background-color:"|
|align=left|Aleksey Ryabchenko
|align=left|Liberal Democratic Party
|
|2.46%
|-
|style="background-color:"|
|align=left|Andrey Antipov
|align=left|Independent
|
|2.44%
|-
|style="background-color:"|
|align=left|Vladimir Komarov
|align=left|Independent
|
|1.63%
|-
|style="background-color:#084284"|
|align=left|Viktor Goryainov
|align=left|Spiritual Heritage
|
|0.90%
|-
|style="background-color:"|
|align=left|Boris Khaytovich
|align=left|Independent
|
|0.72%
|-
|style="background-color:"|
|align=left|Aleksandr Stepanov
|align=left|Independent
|
|0.55%
|-
|style="background-color:#000000"|
|colspan=2 |against all
|
|11.58%
|-
| colspan="5" style="background-color:#E9E9E9;"|
|- style="font-weight:bold"
| colspan="3" style="text-align:left;" | Total
| 
| 100%
|-
| colspan="5" style="background-color:#E9E9E9;"|
|- style="font-weight:bold"
| colspan="4" |Source:
|
|}

2003

|-
! colspan=2 style="background-color:#E9E9E9;text-align:left;vertical-align:top;" |Candidate
! style="background-color:#E9E9E9;text-align:left;vertical-align:top;" |Party
! style="background-color:#E9E9E9;text-align:right;" |Votes
! style="background-color:#E9E9E9;text-align:right;" |%
|-
|style="background-color:"|
|align=left|Viktor Derenkovsky
|align=left|United Russia
|
|36.92%
|-
|style="background-color:#C21022"|
|align=left|Vladimir Kishenin
|align=left|Russian Pensioners' Party-Party of Social Justice
|
|20.36%
|-
|style="background-color:"|
|align=left|Vladimir Beryozov
|align=left|Communist Party
|
|14.13%
|-
|style="background-color:#FFD700"|
|align=left|Viktor Akimov
|align=left|People's Party
|
|3.71%
|-
|style="background:"| 
|align=left|Viktor Dedkov
|align=left|Yabloko
|
|3.60%
|-
|style="background-color:"|
|align=left|Aleksey Ryabchenko
|align=left|Liberal Democratic Party
|
|3.36%
|-
|style="background-color:"|
|align=left|Sergey Stepanov
|align=left|Independent
|
|1.75%
|-
|style="background-color:#164C8C"|
|align=left|Oleg Kosmachev
|align=left|United Russian Party Rus'
|
|1.23%
|-
|style="background-color:#000000"|
|colspan=2 |against all
|
|13.22%
|-
| colspan="5" style="background-color:#E9E9E9;"|
|- style="font-weight:bold"
| colspan="3" style="text-align:left;" | Total
| 
| 100%
|-
| colspan="5" style="background-color:#E9E9E9;"|
|- style="font-weight:bold"
| colspan="4" |Source:
|
|}

Notes

References

Obsolete Russian legislative constituencies
Politics of Smolensk Oblast